National Tertiary Route 814, or just Route 814 (or ) is a National Road Route of Costa Rica, located in the Limón province.

Description
In Limón province the route covers Pococí canton (La Rita, Cariari districts).

References

Highways in Costa Rica